The Department of Employment and Youth Affairs was an Australian government department that existed between December 1978 and May 1982.

Scope
Information about the department's functions and/or government funding allocation could be found in the Administrative Arrangements Orders, the annual Portfolio Budget Statements and in the Department's annual reports.

At its creation, the Department was responsible for the following:
Commonwealth Employment Service
Manpower and training
Youth Affairs
Reinstatement in civil employment - of national servicemen, members of the Reserve Forces and members of the Citizens Forces.

Structure
The Department was an Australian Public Service department, staffed by officials who were responsible to the Minister for Employment and Youth Affairs.

References

Ministries established in 1978
Employment and Youth Affairs